Adam Samuel Bennion (December 2, 1886 – February 11, 1958) was a leader in the Church of Jesus Christ of Latter-day Saints (LDS Church). Born in Taylorsville, Utah Territory, Bennion received degrees from the University of Utah, Columbia University, and the University of California. He also studied at the University of Chicago. He became a member of the Quorum of the Twelve Apostles on April 9, 1953, filling a vacancy created by the death of John A. Widtsoe.

Bennion served less than five years in the Quorum of the Twelve before his death. He was replaced in the Quorum by Hugh B. Brown.

Biography
Adam S. Bennion was the son of Joseph B. Bennion and his wife, Mary Ann Sharp. Joseph died when Bennion was about two years old. After completing his early education in Taylorsville, Bennion went to study at the University of Utah. After his studies he became a teacher at LDS High School in Salt Lake City.

In 1911, Bennion married Minerva Richards Young, a daughter of Richard W. Young. The couple would eventually have three sons and two daughters. After their marriage, Bennion and his wife headed to New York City, where he completed a master's degree at Columbia University.

Bennion returned to Salt Lake City and became an English teacher at Granite High School. In 1913, he became the principal of the school. In the summer of 1914, Bennion took a course in Sunday school administration at the University of Chicago. The following year, he was appointed a member of the General Board of the Deseret Sunday School Union. About the same time, he joined the faculty of the University of Utah in the department of English. In 1915, Bennion was appointed a member of the Church Board of Education of the LDS Church.

In 1919, Bennion became the Superintendent of LDS Church Schools. From 1921 to 1923, he studied at the University of California–Berkeley and completed a doctorate. He then returned to the LDS Church schools, where he worked until 1927 when he began work for the Utah Power and Light Company (UP&L). During the 1920s, Bennion oversaw the expansion of the LDS Church's seminary program and trained seminary teachers at Brigham Young University's Alpine Summer School.

In 1944, Bennion resigned his employment with UP&L and ran as a Republican Party candidate for the United States Senate. He lost the election to Democrat Elbert D. Thomas. Bennion returned to UP&L; in 1947, he became the director of the Denver and Rio Grande Railroad.

In 1953, LDS Church president David O. McKay called Bennion as a member of the Quorum of the Twelve Apostles. Bennion served in this capacity until his death.

Bennion died in Salt Lake City and was buried in Salt Lake City Cemetery.

References

Published works

External links
 
 
 Adam S. Bennion papers, MSS 1 at L. Tom Perry Special Collections, Brigham Young University

1886 births
1958 deaths
American general authorities (LDS Church)
Columbia University alumni
Businesspeople from Salt Lake City
University of Utah alumni
University of California, Berkeley alumni
University of Chicago alumni
University of Utah faculty
Utah Republicans
Richards–Young family
People from Taylorsville, Utah
Apostles (LDS Church)
Sunday School (LDS Church) people
Burials at Salt Lake City Cemetery
Latter Day Saints from Utah